Mahmoud Khalil al-Hussary, also known as Al-Hussary, was an Egyptian Qari widely acclaimed for his accurate recitation of the Qur'an. Al-Hussary committed the entire Qur'an to memory by age 8 and started reciting at public gatherings by age 12. In 1944, Al-Hussary won Egypt Radio's Qu'ran Recitation competition which had around 200 participants, including veterans like  Muhammad Rifat. The quadrumvirate of El Minshawy, Abdul Basit, Mustafa Ismail, and Al-Hussary are generally considered the most important and famous Qurra' of modern times to have had an outsized impact on the Islamic world.

Career

Early life 
Mahmoud entered the Qur'an School at the age of four, and by age 9 (or by 11), he had already memorized the entire Qur'an. By age 11, he had enrolled for training at the acclaimed al-Badawi Mosque in Tanta. He later joined Al-Azhar University in Cairo and was conferred with diploma in "al-Qira'at al-'Ashr".

Service 

He moved to Cairo and joined Egypt's official Qur'an radio station as a reciter making his first appearance on February 16, 1944. Just a year later, in 1945, al-Hussary was appointed reciter at the Ahmad al-Badawi mosque. On August 7, 1948, he was nominated mu'adhin of the Sidi Hamza Mosque and later, a Muqri at the same mosque. He also supervised recitation centers in the al-Gharbia province. Though a conflicting report claims he served at the Ahmad al-Badawi mosque for 10 straight years.

In 1955, he was appointed to the Al-Hussein Mosque in Cairo and remained in-service there for 29 years, until his death.

At Al-Azhar 

After returning to Cairo, al-Hussary studied and taught at Al-Azhar University. In 1960, he led the department of al-Hadith bi Jam'i al-Buhuth al-Islamiyah for correcting Quranic codexes present in the al-Azhar libraries.

As one of the four top-ranking reciters in Egypt, he recorded the complete Quranic text in both styles of recitation, murattal (tarteel) and mujawwad (tajwid) and was, in fact, first-ever Qari to record and broadcast the murattal style. He recorded and wrote treatises on various Qur'an recital styles: Ḥafs ʿan ʿĀṣim in 1961, Warsh ʿan Nāfiʾ in 1964, Qālān ʿan Nâfi’ and ad-Dūrī ʿan Abi ʿAmr in 1968. In the same year, he recorded the Qu'ran in Al-Mushaf Al-Mu’allim style, a tarteel technique with exclusive focus on pedagogy.

Al-Hussary authored 12 books on Qur'anic sciences in a bid to end corruption of both the text and the recitation styles.

Recognition and awards 

In 1944, Al-Hussary won Egypt Radio's Qu'ran Recitation competition which had around 200 participants, among them some veterans like  Muhammad Rifat, Ali Mahmud, and Abd Al-Fattah Ash-Sha'sha'i.

Al-Azhar awarded him the title Shaykh al-Maqāriʾ in 1957. He was also appointed to the board of Islamic research on Hadith and the Qur'an at Al-Azhar.

He was a recipient of the Egyptian Medal of Honour for Arts and Sciences, First Grade, from the Egyptian president Gamal 'Abd Al-Nasir, in 1967. The same year, he was elected the President of the Islamic World League of Qur'an Reciters.

Tours 

In 1960, he travelled to Pakistan and India, the first Egyptian Qari to do so, to recite at a conference in the presence of the first Prime Minister of India, Jawaharlal Nehru, and the first Egyptian President, Gamal Abdul Nasir. He accompanied the Rector of Al-Azhar University on their travels. He was invited to participate in the World of Islam Festival in London (1976). He has recited the Quran in front of the American Congress, the United Nations in 1977, and at the Buckingham Palace in 1978. He has been on Qur'an recital tours to the Philippines, China, France, and Singapore; in addition to touring other Muslim countries, mostly during the month of Ramadan.

Technique 
Al Hussary was a strong proponent of preserving the qiraat art-form in its original scheme (tarteel) and was publicly apprehensive of innovation in recital delivery techniques. He once said: The tarteel shapes every word with an evocative manner, a fact that cannot be produced during a pure "chanted" interpretation where words are subjected to a certain musicality which can be opposing to the necessary sound print to reach the real meaning. And if we feel the melodic saturation during the “chanted” interpretation, we feel, on the other hand, calmness and introversion during tarteel derived from the message of the holy Quran.

In another instance, he said: The tarteel puts us directly on the screen of the Quranic text. It puts us in an active listening position and makes the listener feel the responsibility to listen. However, "chanted" restitution borrows passages of introversion by an envelope of jollity; the tarteel is more difficult because it reveals faithfully the meaning. The roots of tarteel deal basically with the koranic text and not the musical rhythms.

In the preface of one of his books, Ma` Al-Qur’an Al-Karim (lit. With the Holy Koran), Shaykh Mahmud Shaltut, the then chief Imam of the al-Azhar mosque, said about him: God has given to many people the goods of this world and beyond, and granted them by giving them happiness in the two shelters through this right path, the path of the holy Koran. They learned it, recite it and honoured it as it should be. They struggled to protect it and found joy in it because it always guided them towards truth and the right path. Among those, I have known our son Shaykh Khalil Al-Husari. I have discovered in him an excellent qurra who observes God with a huge fear in his recitation by following the methodology of our pious precursors in the reading of Allah's Book, and never moved aside from it. His recitation fulfills the hearts with peace, security and calmness, and opens to his audience the gates of faith.

Death 
He died of liver failure on 24 November 1980 during a trip to Kuwait. His last public recitals were at the Kaaba in Mecca and Masjid al Nabawi in Medina.

Legacy 

Based on Al-Hussary's life, a TV series titled  Imam al-Maqar'ine starring Hassan Youssef was created by Dr. Bahaa El-Din Ibrahim and directed by Mustafa Al-Shall, with backing from Hussary's children, Mohammed Al-Hussary and Yasmine Al-Khayam.

At the time of his death in 1980, he left a third of his wealth to build a mosque on Al-Ajuzah Street in Cairo. In his will, he left the expenses for the mosque he had built in Tanta, as well as for the three Islamic institutes and a center dedicated to Quran memorization, Mahad Azhar, in his village, Shobra al-Namla.

In what's a testament to Al-Hussary's standing in the profession, Mohammed Burhanuddin, a strong proponent of Qur'anic sciences, education, and memorization, conferred his grandson, Husain Burhanuddin, with the title Hussary al-Hind.

The 26th International Quran Contest hosted by Egypt was named after him in his honour.

Al-Hussary's family runs a charity called Shaykh Al Hussary Society, chaired by his daughter, Yasmeen al-Khayam. The Society built Al-Hosary, the largest mosque in 6th of October City, inaugurated in October 2005, in his honour. The mosque complex, a major landmark of the city, also has an orphanage, a Qur'anic institute, and multi-purpose auditoriums.  The mosque rather remarkably hosts sermons from contrarians such as Amr Khaled as well as orthodox clergy of Al-Azhar, and government ministers. The Society has been instrumental in resettling Syrian refugees in Egypt.

Al-Hussary's recordings are extensively used for Quranic memorization and recitation throughout the Muslim world.

References

External links
 Al-Jazeera's  (Arabic)
 Al-Nahar TV's  (Arabic)

Egyptian Quran reciters
Al-Azhar University alumni
1917 births
1980 deaths
People from Tanta